The 1900 Toronto Argonauts season was the club's 15th season of organized league competition since its inception in 1873. The team finished in a first-place tie with the Ottawa Rough Riders in the senior series of the Ontario Rugby Football Union with four wins and two losses, but failed to win the league championship after losing to the Riders in the resulting tie-break game in Toronto.

Regular season

Standings

Schedule

Postseason

References

Toronto Argonauts seasons